Bazil Roland Marsh, MLitt (b Three Hills 11 August  1921 d Northampton 23 May 1997) was Archdeacon of Northampton from 1964 to 1991.

Marsh was educated at the University of Leeds and the College of the Resurrection, Mirfield. After curacies in Cheshunt,  Coventry and Reading he was Rector of St Peter's Anglican Church, Townsville, North Queensland, Australia from 1951 and of St Mary the Virgin, Far Cotton, Northampton, UK from 1956 until his appointment as Archdeacon.

Notes

1921 births
People from Kneehill County
Alumni of the University of Leeds
Alumni of the College of the Resurrection
Archdeacons of Northampton
Holders of a Lambeth degree
1997 deaths